Kamalamai (former name: Sindhulimadi) is a municipality in Sindhuli District, in the Bagmati Province of central south Nepal. At the time of the 2011 Nepal census it had a population of 39,413 people in 9,304 households. The city is located in the Sindhuli Valley of central south Nepal. The historic symbol of the valley, Sindhuli Gadhi fort, is at the peak of a hill of the Mahabharata range. The city is in the plain valley made by the Kamla River. Kamalamai Municipality is the largest municipality of Nepal according to area.

History
The occupation of the Kuti Pass in about 1756 stopped the valley's trade with Tibet. Finally, King Prithvi Narayan Shah entered the valley after the victory of Kirtipur. King Jaya Prakash Malla of Kathmandu sought help from the British and so the East India Company sent a contingent of soldiers under Captain Kinloch in 1767. The British force was defeated at Sindhuli by Prithvi Narayan Shah's army.  It was the first time a British force was defeated in Asia. The British soldiers were completely taken aback by the geography of the place. They were equipped with modern arms and ammunition like guns and cannons but the Gorkha army was brave and they had a better understanding of the terrain. The place where the army of the British Empire was defeated has widely gained popularity. It is called "Sindhuli Gadhi" and is of great historic significance to Nepal.

Crop production

Rice and maize are the major crops in this area.

Temples

 Kamalamai (कमलामाई)
 Siddhababa (सिद्धबाबा)
 Rameshwar Dham (रामेश्वर धाम)
 Ganesh Than (गणेश थान)
 Maisthaan
 Kalimaithaan 
 Rakta Mala
 Sibalaya
 Gayadevi
 Krishna Mandir
 Bakeshwor Mahadev 
 Bhimsen Mandir
 Ganesh Mandir
 Bhadrakaali Mandir

Towns

East 
 Shikhartole
 Madhi Bazaar
 Ratamata
 Krishna Nagar, Panityanki
 Kailash Nagar
 2 no. Bazar
 Gayari Bazar
 Laxman chowk
 Majhitar 
 Gadauli
 Jasedamar

West
 Dhakal Gaun
 Gayatar
 Milanchock
 Rammadhi

North
 Dhungrebaas (ढुङ्रेबास)
 Chiyabari
 Sindhuli Gadhi

South
 Madhutar
 Dhurabazaar (धुराबजार)
 Bhiman bazaar

Education

Kamalamai municipality has a good facility of education up to SLC levels. Suryodaya, Bhagwati, Siddhasthali, Swiss are one of the best boarding in Sindhuli district and Janakpur zone. The quality of +2 levels too is fine here. Many private colleges run +2 commerce affiliated to HSEB. However, the number of +2 science colleges are very few. Science college like Kamala Higher Secondary School is providing good practical based education to students of Sindhuli. This college has been serving as the central of excellence for all science students throughout Sindhuli valley. There are also colleges to teach technical educations. The technical subjects affiliated with CTEVT are also taught here.

Higher education
There are many colleges which facilitate higher education. There are a large number of colleges running courses with affiliation to universities of Nepal. Colleges like Sindhuli Multiple Campus fall under this category. Kamala Science Campus enables students to acquire Bachelor of Science courses (BSc.) BBA, BBS and Diploma Courses of CTEVT and Pharmacy.

Colleges
 Gaumati Model Secondary School
Kamala Science Campus
Siddha Jyoti Shaya Campus
Sindhuli Multiple College
 Sindhuli Community Technical Institute, Sindhuli

Schools
 Bhagawati English Secondary School, 2no. Bazaar
 Shining Moon Academy, Madhutar
 Sindhuli Vidhyashram English Boarding School, Dovantaar
 Sindhuli Pathshalaa, Dhungrebas
 Kamala Higher Secondary School, Dhungrebas
 Gaumati Model Secondary School, Majhitaar
 Shree Jana Jyoti Secondary School
 Barun Devi Secondary School
 Daurali Nimna Secondary School
 Shree Siddhabba Secondary School, Panityanki
 New English Secondary Boarding School, Milan Chowk
 Kalimati Nimna Secondary School
 Suryodaya English Secondary School, Ratmataa
 Siddhababa English Boarding High School
 New Siddhasthali English Boarding School
 Swiss Sindhuli Secondary English Medium School
 Shree Navajyoti Deaf Lower Secondary School

Transportation

Regional
The new section of B.P. Koirala Highway to Kamalamai from Kathmandu opened in 2011 and continues on to Bardibas, though most areas only allow one lane of traffic with hairpin turns. The rest of the route to Bardibas is even and therefore much less dangerous. An old road that connects Dharan through Inner Tarai is going to reopen for the easier movement through the Inner Tarai Valleys of Sindhuli and Udayapur of Western Region to Dharan of Eastern Nepal. Long-route buses run under the local authority in the headquarters which has bus routes to cities like Kathmandu, Janakpur, Biratnagar and Pokhara.

Local
Local transportation consists of minibuses and minivans while most of the parts of Kamalamai are accessible to vehicles. Nowadays common transportation is  auto rickshaws (electrical & Gas).

Media
To promote local culture Kamalamai Municipality has three FM radio stations - Sindhuligadhi FM - 92 MHz, Radio Siddhababa - 98.4 MHz and Radio Sahara - 104.2 MHz.

The KM Club holds various events in colleges of Sindhuli.

References

External links

Populated places in Sindhuli District
Nepal municipalities established in 1997